The Music Explosion was an American garage rock band from Mansfield, Ohio, United States, discovered and signed by record producers Jerry Kasenetz and Jeffry Katz.  The quintet is best known for their number two hit, "Little Bit O' Soul", that received gold record status by the RIAA.  Written by John Carter and Ken Lewis, who had previously written big hits for The Ivy League and Herman's Hermits, the song (Laurie Records No. 3380, subsequently reissued on Buddah Records) was the band's only top 40 hit.  This single paved the way for tours with contemporaries like The Left Banke and The Easybeats.

"Little Bit O' Soul" has been subsequently covered by several bands including The Ramones; Dodging Susan; and 2 Live Crew, who sampled the melody.  On its own, the flip "I See The Light" (featuring a surf guitar bridge) was covered by The Fourth Amendment and had a resurgence on some stations in the Midwest four years later.

In the band's sole album, Kasenetz and Katz wrote several of its tracks, which were blatant re-writes of existing songs.  Bassist Burton Stahl acknowledged these claims.

Lead singer Jamie Lyons (born James Lewis Lyons on January 31, 1949 in Galion, Ohio) also recorded several solo singles on the Laurie label while still recording with the group. His first single, "Soul Struttin'", became a Northern soul hit. Lyons died of heart failure at his home in Little River, South Carolina on September 25, 2006, at age 57. The band continued touring in festivals with a new lead singer. Drummer Bob Avery later became a member of Crazy Elephant.

Band members

Music Explosion
 James "Jamie" Lyons – singer, percussion (died 2006)
 Donald (Tudor) Atkins – guitar
 Richard Nesta – guitar
 Burton Stahl – bass guitar 
 Robert Avery – drums

Super K staff musicians

Discography w/Billboard chart peak positions

Singles

Albums
Little Bit O'Soul (#178) – Laurie SLLP-2040—8/67
Side one:  
"Little Bit O' Soul" / "I See the Light" / "Everybody" / "Love, Love, Love, Love, Love" / "Good Time Feeling" / "96 Tears"
Side two: 
"Can't Stop Now" / "Let Yourself Go" / "Patches Dawn" / "One Potato Two" / "What Did I Do to Deserve Such a Fate" / "(Hey) La, La, La"

"Love, Love, Love, Love, Love" is identical to a recording of the same name by Terry Knight and the Pack (released on the Lucky Eleven label), but has a re-recorded vocal track.

Compilations
Little Bit O' Soul—The Best of the Music Explosion—Sundazed—2002
"Little Bit O'Soul" / "I See the Light" / "Everybody" / "Love, Love, Love, Love, Love" / "Good Time Feeling" / "96 Tears" / "Can't Stop Now" / "Let Yourself Go" / "Patches Dawn" / "One Potato Two" / "What Did I Do to Deserve Such a Fate" / "(Hey) La, La, La" / "Little Black Egg" / "Stay by My Side" / "Sunshine Games" / "We Gotta Go Home" / "Hearts and Flowers" / "What You Want (Baby I Want You)" / "Road Runner" / "Where Are We Going" / "Yes Sir" / "Dazzling" / "Jack in the Box" / "What's Your Name"

Notes

See also
List of 1960s one-hit wonders in the United States

References

External links

Home.comcast.net
Musicexplosionband.com

American pop music groups
Garage rock groups from Ohio
Laurie Records artists